= Umshana =

2015 Swati drama film

- Directed by: Bi Phakathi
- Written by: Bi Phakathi
- Cinematography: Sandile Simelane
- Production company: BIP Films
- Release date: 25 November 2015
- Running time: 51 minutes
- Country: Swaziland
- Language: Siswati

Umshana (lit. 'The Niece') is a 2015 Eswatini black and white drama film directed by Bi Phakathi and produced by BIP Films. The film stars Mbali Dlamini and Delani Dlamini in lead roles along with Lisa Mavuso, Temakhosi Nkambule, Fineboy Mhlanga in supportive roles.

It is the first all-Siswati speaking feature film and it was completely filmed in the Kingdom of Eswatini.

== Cast ==
- Mbali Dlamini as Gugu
- Delani Dlamini as Themba
- Lisa Mavuso as Gugu's Friend
- Temakhosi Nkambule as Precious
- Fineboy Mhlanga as Uncle
